The Dublin Senior Hurling League is a league competition for the top hurling clubs in Dublin. The 2010 champions were Craobh Chiaráin who defeated rivals Crumlin to claim the title. The 2011 winners were Kilmacud Crokes who beat 2010 finalists Crumlin in the 2011 final at Parnell Park. Ballyboden defeated Craobh Chiaráin in the 2012 final by 3 points despite shooting 14 wides in the second half.

Roll of honour

References

Hurling competitions in County Dublin
Hurling leagues in Ireland
1904 establishments in Ireland
Sports leagues established in 1904